Dimension PSI is a six-part German documentary series about paranormal phenomena. It first aired in 2003 on publicly owned television channel Das Erste. Each episode covers one paranormal topic respectively. Those are psychokinesis, ghosts, exorcism, telepathy, reincarnation and near death experiences.

See also
List of German television series

External links
 

2003 German television series debuts
2003 German television series endings
German-language television shows
Das Erste original programming